Kanika Dhillon is an Indian author and screenwriter. As an author, she has released three novels, Bombay Duck is a Fish (2011), a satire on the Indian film industry, the young adult superhero novel Shiva and the Rise of the Shadows (2013), and the drama The Dance of Durga (2016). Dhillon has written the screenplay for the Bollywood superhero film Ra.One (2011), the Telugu–Tamil bilingual comedy Size Zero (2015), and the romantic drama Manmarziyaan (2018)

Life and career
Kanika Dhillon was born in Amritsar, and after completing her undergraduate education from St. Stephen's College, Delhi, she pursued a master's degree at the London School of Economics. Soon after graduating, she relocated to Mumbai and worked as a script supervisor for Shah Rukh Khan's production company Red Chillies Entertainment. She went on to serve as an assistant director for the company's 2007 film Om Shanti Om. After working as a script supervisor for another one of the company's production, the comedy-drama Billu (2009), Dhillon went on to write for two television series, the NDTV Imagine sitcom Ghar Ki Baat Hai (2009) and the Disney India children's show Ishaan: Sapno Ko Awaaz De (2010–2011).

In 2011, Dhillon published her first novel, the satire Bombay Duck is a Fish, about Neki Brar, a girl aspiring for a career in Hindi films. The book was launched by Shah Rukh Khan. Reviewing the book for Daily News and Analysis, Rupa Gulab found it to be "a racy and witty lowdown on peer politics, star egos, sleaze, love rats, spot boys, junior artistes, ‘gora’ extras, etc." Rashi Tiwari of News18 commented that the book "is written with a light touch but nevertheless strikes a chord with not just Bollywood aspirants but also those looking for a fantastical getaway." Also that year, she served as a screenwriter for the superhero film Ra.One, directed by Anubhav Sinha and starring Khan.

For her prime accomplishments, Hindustan Times honoured Dhillon in 2012 at their annual youth summit "Top 30 Under 30". Following Ra.One, Dhillon was keen to write a superhero novel aimed at teenagers. Inspired by the doomsday theories of 2012, she released her next book, Shiva & The Rise of The Shadows in 2013. In 2015, she served as the writer for the Telugu–Tamil bilingual comedy Size Zero, which starred Anushka Shetty as an overweight woman who admits herself to a weight loss clinic. Initially written for Hindi film, it was eventually made in South India after Dhillon's husband, the filmmaker Prakash Kovelamudi, liked the script and directed it himself.

Dhillon's third novel, The Dance of Durga, was released in 2016. It tells the story of Rajjo, a naive young woman who transforms into a Godwoman. In a review for Hindustan Times, Khushboo Shukla labelled the book "gripping" and commended Dhillon for successfully exploring faith and culture of rural India. Deepa Suryanarayan of Femina praised the complex character of Rajjo and wrote that despite the character's misdeeds, she had empathised with Rajjo.

Dhillon has written the scripts for the 2018 Hindi films Anurag Kashyap's drama Manmarziyaan, starring Abhishek Bachchan, Taapsee Pannu, and Vicky Kaushal; and Abhishek Kapoor's romance Kedarnath, starring Sushant Singh Rajput and Sara Ali Khan.

She has also written the script of her husband's satire on mental illness, Judgemental Hai Kya, starring Kangana Ranaut and Rajkummar Rao.The right wing Hindu Nationalists started a Twitter campaign to boycott movie Raksha Bandhan which she wrote. The campaign was against her liberal views.

During promotion of judgemental hai kya, director Prakash Kovelamudi and Kanika announced their separation and said they were already separated two years earlier.

Personal life
Kanika married her first husband, director Prakash Kovelamudi, in 2014 and divorced him in 2017.

In January 2021, Kanika married  Himanshu Sharma.

Bibliography 
 Bombay Duck is a Fish (2011)
 Shiva and the Rise of the Shadows (2013)
 The Dance of Durga (2016)

Filmography

Film

Television
 Ghar Ki Baat Hai (2009)
 Ishaan: Sapno Ko Awaaz De (2010–2011)

References

External links 

 

Living people
Indian women television writers
Writers from Amritsar
St. Stephen's College, Delhi alumni
St. Xavier's College, Mumbai alumni
Alumni of the London School of Economics
Indian women screenwriters
Indian television writers
Women writers from Punjab, India
Screenwriters from Punjab, India
Indian women novelists
1982 births